The Yuba River is a tributary of the Feather River in the Sierra Nevada and eastern Sacramento Valley, in the U.S. state of California. The Yuba River proper is formed at the North Yuba and Middle Yuba rivers' confluence, with the South Yuba joining a short distance downstream.

The river drains , mostly in the western slope and foothills of the Sierra Nevada. Since the early 20th century, irrigation and hydropower diversion projects have gradually reduced the river's flow.

The river's name comes from the local tribe, the Nisenan, word for "waterway," 'uba seo.  It is spelled in early records as Yubu and applied to the river by 1844. Some claim the name is a variant of Spanish uba or uva, referring to grapes found growing along the banks of the river.

Course

North Yuba River

It flows southwest then west through a  canyon past the communities of Downieville (where it receives the Downie River from the north) and Goodyears Bar. Its main tributaries, Canyon Creek and Slate Creek, join from the north shortly downstream of there. The river turns south near Clipper Mills and flows into the  New Bullards Bar Reservoir, impounded by -high New Bullards Bar Dam.

Middle Yuba River

Originating in a bowl-shaped valley in Moscove Meadow, the  Middle Yuba River  flows north into Jackson Meadows Reservoir, then turns west, soon entering a steep gorge. The majority of the river demarcates the boundary of Sierra County in the north and Nevada County in the south. It receives Kanaka Creek from the north and is then interrupted by the Our House Diversion Dam, which diverts water from the Middle Fork to the North Fork at New Bullards Bar Reservoir.

South Yuba River

The   South Yuba River originates at Lake Angela in Nevada County about three quarters of a mile north of Donner Pass, about three miles east of the town of Soda Springs.  After passing through Lake Van Norden with Upper Castle Creek (longer than the Lake Angela stem) entering from the right, it gathers numerous snow-fed tributaries running west through a marshy, lake-filled valley, crossing Interstate 80 several times. The river briefly enters Placer County before flowing back north into Nevada County, then flows into Lake Spaulding, where much of its water is diverted south to the Bear River drainage. The remainder of the river turns northward into a gorge near Emigrant Gap before continuing west. It receives Canyon Creek from the right, then receives Poorman Creek also from the right near Washington. The river continues west into the foothills and into South Yuba River State Park where it is bridged by State Route 49. It joins the Yuba River at the upper end of Englebright Lake.

Main stem

From the joining of the North Yuba River and Middle Yuba River, it flows southwards, then southwest, through the Sierra Nevada foothills, forming the Yuba-Nevada County border. The river widens into upper Englebright Lake near French Bar, and is joined by the South Yuba within the reservoir. It passes through the Englebright Dam near Lake Wildwood and is then joined by Deer Creek (which flows out of Lake Wildwood) on the left. The Yuba River bed widens considerably as it flows out into the Sacramento Valley near the Yuba Goldfields, a section of the Yuba River valley consisting of dredged sediments washed down by hydraulic mining in the 19th century. The river then turns southwest, flowing through irrigated farmland. It then skirts the south side of Marysville and empties into the Feather River between the cities of Marysville, Yuba City and Linda.

History

The Yuba River valley was originally one of the most densely populated Native American areas in California. Historians divide indigenous peoples living in the Yuba River area into several groups – the Konkow, Maidu, Nisenan and Miwok. These groups did not function as large tribes; rather, they were divided into hundreds of small villages, with distinct governments but similar customs. Like other indigenous people of the Sierra Nevada foothill region, their staple food was acorns, but they also hunted and gathered for other foods including abundant salmon runs in the Yuba River.

In the 1850s, the California Gold Rush brought large numbers of European-American settlers into the area, followed by many Mexican, African and Chinese immigrants. These settlers brought diseases with them, to which the Native Americans had no immunity. Within a few years, these diseases wiped out most of the native population. The Yuba River and its forks were one of the richest parts of the Mother Lode, and miners poured to the region in great numbers. Although gold was first extracted by simple methods such as panning and sluicing, large-scale industrial hydraulic mining left a much greater impact. About 25 million cubic yards (19,400,000 m3) of hydraulic mining debris was carried down the Yuba River. The practice was banned in 1884 following lawsuits from farmers who had been affected by the debris flows.

Much of the debris left by the destruction of hydraulic mining remains today as the Yuba Goldfields. In addition, the extensive use of mercury in processing gold led to contamination of a relatively large area. The contamination was still detectable in 2013 and will be so for an estimated time of more than 10,000 years.

Dams and diversions

Like the majority of California rivers, the Yuba was dammed at many points during the 20th century, and large amounts of water are withdrawn for irrigation and municipal water supply. Daguerre Point Dam was built in 1906 by the U.S. Army Corps of Engineers in order to trap hydraulic mining debris. After concerns about its impact on fish populations, the dam was fitted with fish ladders in 1937. In 1922-24 PG&E built the original Bullards Bar Dam to produce hydroelectricity and trap debris. The concrete arch Englebright Dam was built in 1941 to trap mining debris following the re-legalization of hydraulic mining during the 1930s. However, mining never resumed on a Gold Rush scale in the Yuba River watershed. Today, Englebright serves mainly to produce hydroelectricity.

New Bullards Bar Dam was built on the North Yuba River in response to the huge flood of December 1955, which destroyed much of Yuba City. It stores almost 1 million acre feet (1.2 km3) to provide flood control, irrigation and hydroelectricity.

The Yuba River Development Project includes New Bullards Bar Dam and a number of supporting facilities, including a diversion dam (Our House Dam) and tunnel which divert the Middle Yuba River into New Bullards Bar Reservoir, to increase hydropower generation. These diversions have resulted in the seasonal dewatering of the lower North Yuba River and Middle Yuba River and about four miles of the main Yuba River.

The Middle Yuba River and South Yuba River are linked by the Yuba-Bear and Drum-Spaulding hydroelectric projects, which are owned by the Nevada Irrigation District and PG&E, respectively. These two interconnected projects generate a combined 1.2 billion kilowatt hours per year and with over 40 dams and reservoirs and 16 powerhouses, are considered the most complex hydroelectric scheme in the United States. Major dams include Jackson Meadows Dam and Bowman Dam (part of Yuba-Bear) and Lake Spaulding Dam and Fordyce Lake Dam (part of Drum-Spaulding). These projects divert a portion of the Yuba River's flow to the Bear River, a tributary of the Feather River further south.

Other dams include Scotts Flat and Wildwood on Deer Creek; and Mildred and Virginia Ranch on Dry Creek, a lower tributary of the Yuba.

Environmental issues
The California Office of Environmental Health Hazard Assessment has issued a safe eating advisory for any fish caught in Yuba River, North Yuba River, and Middle Yuba River due to elevated levels of mercury.

The Spring and Shady tributaries of the South Yuba  contain dozens of historic mine locations, the largest of which is the San Juan Ridge Mine. Mining operations in the area began in 1850 and have been more or less driven by the price of gold since that time. In 1995, the San Juan Ridge Mine Corporation stopped gold mining operations following the breach of an underground aquifer that caused flooding and the overflow of containment ponds. This breach released millions of gallons of mine waste into Spring and Shady creeks, drained and contaminated 12 local wells through the oxidation of naturally occurring heavy metals- including a well that supplied drinking water to a local K-8 school. The mining company proposed to re-open their mine for gold extraction in 2012, which would require pumping up to 3.5 million gallons of groundwater to operate each day. Pumping groundwater at this scale would likely deplete the underground aquifer that provides water to hundreds of community members. This could potentially cause serious impacts to surface water quality in Spring and Shady creeks due to increased surface flows from mining practices.

Tributaries
In hierarchical order, going upstream:

Dry Creek
Keystone Creek
New York Creek
Deer Creek
Squirrel Creek
North Fork Deer Creek
South Fork Deer Creek
South Yuba River
Shady Creek
Humbug Creek
Poorman Creek
South Fork Poorman Creek
Fordyce Creek
North Creek
Rattlesnake Creek
Lower Castle Creek
Upper Castle Creek
Dobbins Creek
Middle Yuba River
Clear Creek
Oregon Creek
Grizzly Creek
Brush Creek
Grizzly Creek
Indian Creek
Kanaka Creek
Wolf Creek
East Fork Creek
Pass Creek
French Creek
North Yuba River
Willow Creek
Bridger Creek
Brandy Creek
Mill Creek
Slate Creek
Canyon Creek
Little Canyon Creek
East Fork Canyon Creek
South Fork Canyon Creek
Cherokee Creek
Fiddle Creek
Goodyears Creek
Downie River
Pauley Creek
Lavezzola Creek
Empire Creek
Sunnyside Creek
Spencer Creek
West Branch Downie River
Haypress Creek
Salmon Creek
Deer Creek
Lincoln Creek
Dorsey Creek

See also
 List of rivers of California

References

 
Tributaries of the Feather River
Rivers of the Sierra Nevada in California
Geography of the Sacramento Valley
Rivers of Nevada County, California
Rivers of Sierra County, California
Rivers of Yuba County, California
Downieville, California
Rivers of Northern California
Rivers of the Sierra Nevada (United States)